Zoophorus was the Ancient Greek term for a decorated frieze between the architrave and cornice, typically with a continuous bas-relief. The term comes from the Greek, meaning "bearing an animal". A zoophoric column is a pillar supporting the figure of an animal.  The word is rarely used in modern English architectural writing.

References

Reliefs
Columns and entablature
Ornaments (architecture)